The Virgin Islands sent 88 athletes (63 males, 25 females) to the XXIst Central American and Caribbean Games in Mayagüez, Puerto Rico, July 17 - August 1, 2010.

The athletes participated in athletics (9), baseball (20), basketball (22), bowling (4), boxing (3), sailing (10), shooting (4), swimming (7), tennis (5), and triathlon (1).

Medalists

Gold

Silver

Bronze

Results by event

Athletics

Baseball

Basketball

Bowling

Boxing

Sailing

Shooting

Swimming

Kevin Hensley (m)
Lauren Kelly Lewis (f)
Bryson Eduard Mays (m)
Ryan Andrew Nelthropp (m)
Brigitte Marie Rasmussen (f)
Caylee Victoria Watson (f)
Branden Whitehurst (m)

Tennis

Triathlon

References

External links

Nations at the 2010 Central American and Caribbean Games
2010
Central American and Caribbean Games